Savonlinna Cathedral is located in Savonlinna, Finland. It was built between 1874 and 1878 and designed by architect Axel Hampus Dalström in the Gothic Revival style. It has room for 1000 people.

History
The people of Savonlinna had no church of their own and were obliged to go to the church in Sääminki. In 1850 governor Aleksander Thesleff gave orders to build a church in Savonniemi. The actual construction began in 1874.

In 1896 the new Diocese of Savonlinna was founded and the Savonlinna church became a cathedral. The first bishop was Gustaf Johansson. In 1925 the bishop's seat was moved to Vyborg, but the church still retained "cathedral" as its name.

During the Winter War on 1 May 1940, Savonlinna was bombed and the church was damaged. It was restored in 1947–1948 by architect Bertel Liljeqvist. In 1990–1991, it was renovated by Ansu Ånström.

References

External links

Savonlinna
Lutheran cathedrals in Finland
Gothic Revival church buildings in Finland
Buildings and structures in South Savo
Tourist attractions in South Savo
Former cathedrals